Mohamed Selliti (born 28 March 1981) is a Tunisian footballer. He plays as a striker as well as Tunisia national football team.

References

1981 births
Living people
Tunisian footballers
Tunisia international footballers
Tunisian expatriate footballers
Stade Tunisien players
Club Africain players
Étoile Sportive du Sahel players
Ismaily SC players
Olympique Béja players
Expatriate footballers in Egypt
Egyptian Premier League players

Association football forwards